Perlodinae is a subfamily of springflies in the family Perlodidae. There are at least 20 genera and 60 described species in Perlodinae.

Genera
These 25 genera belong to the subfamily Perlodinae:

 Arcynopteryx Klapálek, 1904 i c g
 Baumannella Stark and Stewart, 1985 i c g
 Chernokrilus Ricker, 1952 i c g
 Cultus Ricker, 1952 i c g b
 Diploperla Needham & Claassen, 1925 i c g b
 Diura Billberg, 1820 i c g b
 Frisonia Ricker, 1943 i c g
 Helopicus Ricker, 1952 i c g b
 Hydroperla Frison, 1935 i c g
 Isogenoides Klapálek, 1912 i c g b
 Kogotus Ricker, 1952 i c g b
 Malirekus Ricker, 1952 i c g b
 Megarcys Klapálek, 1912 i c g b
 Oconoperla Stark and Stewart, 1982 i c g
 Oroperla Needham, 1933 i c g
 Osobenus Ricker, 1952 i c g
 Perlinodes Needham and Claassen, 1925 i c g
 Pictetiella Illies, 1966 i c g
 Remenus Ricker, 1952 i c g b
 Rickera Jewett, 1954 i c g
 Salmoperla Baumann and Lauck, 1987 i c g
 Setvena Illies, 1966 i c g
 Skwala Ricker, 1943 i c g b
 Susulus Bottorff & Stewart, 1989 i c g b
 Yugus Ricker, 1952 i c g b

Data sources: i = ITIS, c = Catalogue of Life, g = GBIF, b = Bugguide.net

References

Further reading

External links

 

Perlodidae